The U.S. Pharmacist is a monthly magazine for pharmacists and health professionals. It is published by Jobson Publishing. In 2018 the company was acquired by WebMD. The magazine is based in Riverton, New Jersey. As of 2013 Harold Cohen was the editor-in-chief of U.S. Pharmacist.

References

External links
 

Monthly magazines published in the United States
Health magazines
Magazines with year of establishment missing
Magazines published in New Jersey
Professional and trade magazines